was a Japanese actress. She appeared in nearly 200 films between 1934 and 1991.

Career
After graduating from Kuki High School, Miyake joined the Shochiku film studios in 1934 and made her film debut the same year with Yume no sasayaki. She starred in many films directed by Yasujirō Ozu, including Late Spring and Tokyo Story. She also frequently appeared in television dramas.

Selected filmography

References

External links 

1916 births
1992 deaths
Japanese film actresses
Japanese television actresses
People from Saitama (city)